Bikah District is a district (bakhsh) in Rudan County, Hormozgan Province, Iran. At the 2006 census, its population was 22,532, in 4,666 families.  The District has one city Bika.  The District has two rural districts (dehestan): Berentin Rural District and Bikah Rural District.

References 

Districts of Hormozgan Province
Rudan County